Pu Songling (5 June 1640 – 25 February 1715) was a Chinese writer during the Qing dynasty, best known as the author of Strange Tales from a Chinese Studio (Liaozhai zhiyi).

Biography
Pu was born into a poor merchant family from Zichuan (淄川, in Zibo, Shandong). At the age of 18, he received the Xiucai degree in the Imperial examination. It was not until he was 71 that he was awarded the Gongsheng ("tribute student") degree for his achievement in literature rather than for passing the Imperial examinations.

He spent most of his life working as a private tutor, collecting the stories that were later published in Strange Tales from a Chinese Studio in 1740. Some critics attribute the Vernacular Chinese novel Xingshi Yinyuan Zhuan ("Marriage Destinies to Awaken the World") to him.

Translations of his work

 Strange Tales from Liaozhai (tr. Sidney L. Sondergard). Jain Pub Co., 2008. .
 Strange Tales from a Chinese Studio (tr. John Minford). London: Penguin, 2006. 562 pages. .
 Strange Tales from the Liaozhai Studio (Zhang Qingnian, Zhang Ciyun and Yang Yi). Beijing: People's China Publishing, 1997. .
 Strange Tales from Make-do Studio (Denis C. & Victor H. Mair). Beijing: Foreign Languages Press, 1989.
 Strange Tales of Liaozhai (Lu Yunzhong, Chen Tifang, Yang Liyi, and Yang Zhihong). Hong Kong: Commercial Press, 1982.
 Strange Stories from the Lodge of Leisures (George Soulié). London: Constable, 1913.
 Strange Stories from a Chinese Studio (tr. Herbert A. Giles). London: T. De La Rue, 1880. .

Movies 

 The Knight of Shadows: Between Yin and Yang  2019, Jackie Chan as Pu Songling

References
Encyclopædia Britannica 2005 Ultimate Reference Suite DVD, – P'u Sung-ling
Death of Woman Wang 1978, – Johnathon D Spence

Further reading
 Chun-shu, Chang, and Shelley Hsueh-lun Chang (1998) Redefining History: Ghosts, Spirits, and Human Society in P'u Sung-ling's World, 1640–1715. Ann Arbor: University of Michigan Press. 
 Judith T. Zeitlin (1993). Historian of the Strange : Pu Songling and the Chinese Classical Tale. Stanford, Calif.: Stanford University Press, xii, 332p. .
 Owen, Stephen, "Pu Song-ling (1640–1715), Liao-zhai's Record of Wonders," in Stephen Owen, ed. An Anthology of Chinese Literature: Beginnings to 1911. New York: W. W. Norton, 1997. p. 1103-1126 (Archive).

Notes

External links

 

 

1640 births
1715 deaths
17th-century Chinese novelists
18th-century Chinese novelists
Chinese male short story writers
Collectors of fairy tales
Qing dynasty short story writers
Short story writers from Shandong
Strange Stories from a Chinese Studio
Writers from Zibo
17th-century Chinese musicians